The 2016 African Wrestling Championships was held in Alexandria, Egypt from 2 to 7 March 2016.

Medal table

Team ranking

Medal summary

Men's freestyle

Men's Greco-Roman

Women's freestyle

References 

African Wrestling Championships
Africa
African Wrestling Championships
International sports competitions hosted by Egypt
African Wrestling Championships